Eleodes gracilis is a species of desert stink beetle in the family Tenebrionidae.

Subspecies
These subspecies belong to the species Eleodes gracilis:
 Eleodes gracilis distans
 Eleodes gracilis gracilis

References

Further reading

External links

 

Tenebrionidae